Demang Lehman Stadium (Stadion Demang Lehman) previously named the stadium Indrasari, is a multi-purpose stadium located in the Banjarbaru, South Kalimantan, Indonesia, which is also the headquarters while (Homebase) football club Barito Putera for two seasons ISL and to finish remodeling 17th May Stadium. 

The stadium was opened on 18 January 2013 by the Regents of Banjar Sultan H. Khairul Saleh. The stadium is owned by the Government of Banjar Regency and the stadium was built in preparation for Banjar District to host the implementation of Provincial Sports Week South Kalimantan in 2013.

The stadium's capacity is 15,000 people. Demang Lehman uses Zoysia matrella  type of grass that has been certified to be strong by FIFA. The lighting for night matches has the power of 1.000 lux.

History

The Stadium originally opened to the public in 2013 as a Multi-purpose stadium with a capacity around 6.500.

References

Football venues in Indonesia
Multi-purpose stadiums in Indonesia
Buildings and structures in South Kalimantan